The chapters of the manga series Nabari no Ou are written and illustrated by Yuhki Kamatani and have been serialized in Square Enix's magazine Monthly GFantasy since its premiere in the June 2004 issue. The plot follows Miharu Rokujou, a fourteen-year-old student who becomes able to control creation because a secret art called the Shinra Banshou has merged with his body. He tries to escape those wishing to possess the Shinra Banshou by searching for a non-lethal way to remove it.

Since the series' premiere, over sixty chapters have been released in Japan. The individual chapters are published in tankōbon by Square Enix under their Gangan Comics imprint. The first volume was released on November 27, 2004 and as of December 9, 2009, twelve volumes have been released. The chapters were adapted into an anime series directed by Kunihisa Sugishima, and animated by J.C.Staff. It began airing in April 2008 and ended its run in September 2008.

On April 19, 2008 at New York Comic Con, Yen Press announced that they had licensed the manga for an English language release in North America. The publisher also serializes the series in the Yen Plus anthology magazine, the first issue of which was released on July 29, 2008 with five Square Enix titles, including Nabari no Ou. The first collected volume of the series was released in May 2009 in North America, and as of October 2009, two volumes have been released. This series has been licensed in France by Asuka and in Taiwan by Sharp Point Press.

Volume list

See also 
List of Nabari no Ou episodes
List of Nabari no Ou characters

References 

Nabari no Ou